3rd SLGFCA Awards
January 7, 2007

Best Film: 
The Departed

Best Directors: 
Martin Scorsese
The Departed
The 3rd St. Louis Gateway Film Critics Association Awards were given on January 7, 2007.

Top Films of 2006
(in alphabetical order)
Blood Diamond
The Departed
Dreamgirls
Flags of Our Fathers
The Good Shepherd
The Last King of Scotland
Notes on a Scandal
The Queen
United 93

Winners & Nominees

Best Actor
Forest Whitaker - The Last King of Scotland as Idi Amin
 Leonardo DiCaprio - Blood Diamond 
 Leonardo DiCaprio - The Departed
 Matt Damon - The Good Shepherd
 Aaron Eckhart - Thank You for Smoking
 Ryan Gosling - Half Nelson
 Edward Norton - The Painted Veil
 Will Smith - The Pursuit of Happyness

Best Actress
Helen Mirren - The Queen as Queen Elizabeth II
 Annette Bening - Running with Scissors
 Juliette Binoche - Breaking and Entering
 Judi Dench - Notes on a Scandal
 Kate Winslet - Little Children

Best Animated or Children's Film
Cars
 Charlotte's Web
 Happy Feet
 Monster House
 Over the Hedge

Best Cinematography
The Painted Veil
 Babel
 Blood Diamond
 The Departed
 Flags of Our Fathers
 Hollywoodland
 Letters from Iwo Jima

Best Director
Martin Scorsese - The Departed
 Bill Condon - Dreamgirls 
 Robert De Niro - The Good Shepherd
 Clint Eastwood - Flags of Our Fathers
 Clint Eastwood - Letters from Iwo Jima
 Stephen Frears - The Queen
 Paul Greengrass - United 93
 Edward Zwick - Blood Diamond

Best Documentary
An Inconvenient Truth
 Deliver Us from Evil
 The Heart of the Game
 Iraq for Sale
 Why We Fight

Best Foreign Language Film
El laberinto del fauno (Pan's Labyrinth) • Mexico/Spain/United States
 Apocalypto
 Das Leben der Anderen (The Lives of Others)
 Sorstalanság (Fateless)
 Volver (To Return)
 Zui hao de shi guang (Three Times)

Best Overlooked Film
Running with Scissors
 Brick
 Brothers of the Head
 Kekexili: Mountain Patrol
 Keeping Up with the Steins
 Deliver Us from Evil
 Lonesome Jim

Best Picture
The Departed
 Blood Diamond
 Dreamgirls
 Flags of Our Fathers
 The Good Shepherd
 The Last King of Scotland
 Notes on a Scandal
 The Queen
 United 93

Best Screenplay
The Queen - Peter Morgan Bobby - Emilio Estevez
 The Departed - William Monahan
 Little Children - Todd Field
 Little Miss Sunshine - Michael Arndt
 Notes on a Scandal - Patrick Marber
 Thank You for Smoking - Jason Reitman

Best Supporting ActorDjimon Hounsou - Blood Diamond as Solomon Vandy
 Ben Affleck - Hollywoodland
 Adam Beach - Flags of Our Fathers
 Steve Carell - Little Miss Sunshine
 Chalo Gonzales - Quinceañera
 Eddie Murphy - Dreamgirls
 Jack Nicholson - The Departed

Best Supporting ActressJennifer Hudson - Dreamgirls as Effie White
 Cate Blanchett - Notes on a Scandal
 Abigail Breslin - Little Miss Sunshine
 Jill Clayburgh - Running with Scissors
 Shareeka Epps - Half Nelson
 Rinko Kikuchi - Babel
 Meryl Streep - The Devil Wears Prada
 Lili Taylor - Factotum

Best Visual/Special EffectsPirates of the Caribbean: Dead Man's Chest
 The Fountain
 El laberinto del fauno (Pan's Labyrinth)
 V for Vendetta
 Superman Returns
 District B-13

Most Original, Innovative or Creative Film
United 93
 The Science of Sleep
 Little Miss Sunshine
 Brick
 Little Children
Zen Noir
 El laberinto del fauno (Pan's Labyrinth)

References
IMDb - St. Louis Film Critics Association Awards

2006
2006 film awards
2006 in Missouri
St Louis